The 2010 New York gubernatorial election was held on Tuesday, November 2, 2010. Incumbent Democratic Governor David Paterson, elected as lieutenant governor in 2006 as the running mate of Eliot Spitzer, chose not to run for a full term. Democratic New York Attorney General Andrew Cuomo defeated Republican Carl Paladino to become the next governor of New York.

Republicans flipped the following counties from 2006: Genesee County, Chautauqua County, Cattaraugus County, Erie County, Niagara County, Fulton County, Steuben County, Tioga County or Schoharie County.

As of 2022, this is the last election that Erie County voted Republican in a gubernatorial election, as well as the last time that a Democrat won over 60% of the vote in a gubernatorial election. This is the last time Democrats won the following counties in a gubernatorial election: Cayuga, Chemung, Chenango, Cortland, Delaware, Dutchess, Greene, Herkimer, Jefferson, Lewis, Livingston, Madison, Montgomery, Oneida, Ontario, Orange, Oswego, Otsego, Putnam, Rensselaer, St. Lawerence, Saratoga, Schuyler, Seneca, Sullivan, Warren, Washington, Wayne, and Yates.

Democratic primary

Candidates

Nominee 
 Andrew Cuomo, Attorney General of New York.

Withdrew 
David Paterson, incumbent Governor of New York (withdrew February 26, 2010)

Failed to qualify 
Jimmy McMillan, founder of the Rent Is Too Damn High Party
 Joel Tyner, Dutchess County legislator
Incumbent Democratic Governor David Paterson had announced that he was running for election in 2009. Paterson had been elected lieutenant governor of New York in 2006, and was sworn in as Governor on March 17, 2008. On September 18, 2009, advisors to President Barack Obama informed Paterson that the President believed Paterson should withdraw his gubernatorial candidacy and clear a path for "popular Attorney General Andrew Cuomo" to run. Paterson insisted he was still running, and reiterated his position on February 9, 2010. On February 26, 2010, however, Paterson withdrew his bid for a full term as governor of New York "amid crumbling support from his party and an uproar over his administration’s intervention in a domestic violence case involving a close aide".

Democratic New York State Attorney General Andrew Cuomo was widely rumored to be considering a 2010 gubernatorial bid. Though he had originally denied any interest, this did not stop rampant speculation that Cuomo would change his mind and enter the race. By December, Cuomo had a massive lead over Paterson in the polls, had higher approval and favorability ratings, and decisively beat any Republican challenger in every poll. After over a year of dodging speculation, Cuomo finally announced his candidacy on May 22, 2010 outside the Tweed Courthouse at New York's City Hall.

Dutchess County legislator Joel Tyner ran an unsuccessful petition drive that fell short of the 15,000 signatures necessary to get onto the primary ballot.

Rent Is Too Damn High Party founder Jimmy McMillan filed petitions to appear on the Democratic primary ballot and the Rent Is Too Damn High line. However, he put very little effort into the Democratic petitions, and the vast majority of the 13,350 signatures bearing his name were collected by Randy Credico, who had partnered with McMillan for a joint Democratic petition. Credico had counted on McMillan to collect 10,000 signatures to put his total at over 20,000, above the 15,000 required to get onto the ballot, but McMillan never followed through, leaving both candidates short of the necessary signatures to force a Democratic primary against Cuomo, who was thus unopposed. Credico, in response, called McMillan a "jack-off" and a "sorry ass", accusing him of "working against me", "turn[ing] in a wagonload of blank pages and then [leaving] Albany in brand new automobiles." McMillan did file the necessary signatures to get onto the "Rent Is 2 Damn High" line; the petitions were technically invalid because they did not include a lieutenant governor candidate, but McMillan was allowed onto the ballot anyway because nobody challenged the petitions.

Polling

Results 
Cuomo was unopposed for the Democratic nomination.

Lieutenant Governor 
Unelected Lieutenant Governor Richard Ravitch did not seek election in 2010.

Cuomo selected Rochester mayor Bob Duffy as his running mate on May 26, 2010. Other Democrats mentioned as potential candidates include Ramapo town supervisor Christopher St. Lawrence, State Senator Andrea Stewart-Cousins (D-Yonkers), Buffalo mayor Byron Brown, State Senator Darrel Aubertine, and Canandaigua businessman Bill Samuels.

Republican primary

Candidates

Nominee 
Carl Paladino, Buffalo developer and political activist

Lost nomination 
Rick Lazio, former Congressman, 2000 Republican nominee for U.S. Senate, and official party designee
Warren Redlich, attorney and Libertarian Party gubernatorial nominee
Steven A. Levy, Suffolk County executive
Myers Mermel, real estate developer
On September 21, 2009, former Long Island Congressman and 2000 Republican U.S. Senate nominee Rick Lazio declared his 2010 candidacy for governor of New York; Lazio made a formal announcement in Albany, New York the following day. Lazio was the frontrunner for the Republican nomination.

Other potential 2010 Republican gubernatorial candidates included former New York City Mayor Rudy Giuliani and Erie County Executive Chris Collins. In April 2009, a Quinnipiac poll showed Giuliani slightly ahead of incumbent David Paterson. Giuliani stated in June 2009 that he was considering running. In December 2009, Giuliani announced that he would not run and would instead back Lazio. On January 26, 2010, Collins announced that he would not run; he did not endorse Lazio, and instead encouraged the Party to choose someone else.

On March 19, 2010, Steve Levy, the county executive of Suffolk County, announced that he would run for Governor as a Republican. Republican Party Chairman Ed Cox threw his support to Levy.

After Collins passed on the race, activist Rus Thompson persuaded developer Carl Paladino to consider running for Governor. In March 2010, Paladino was strongly considering a run and was said to be willing to spend $10,000,000 of his own money on a campaign. He advised state Republican Party chairman Edward F. Cox of his intentions. Paladino announced his candidacy on April 5, 2010.

At the June 2010 Republican Convention, Lazio won the support of 59% of the delegates and was designated the Party's candidate for Governor. Levy "received 28 percent [of the vote] on the first ballot, squeaking above the 25 percent threshold needed to force a second vote on his authorization. While he [had] signed a Republican registration form, Levy [remained] an enrolled Democrat. As such, a separate vote authorizing his appearance in a primary was held: Levy garnered the support of 42.66 percent of the delegates, short of the 50 percent required". Paladino received eight percent of the vote, and real estate consultant Myers Mermel received four percent. On July 15, 2010, Paladino mounted a primary challenge against Lazio by filing petitions. He filed enough petitions to be placed on the ballot for the Republican primary.

By September 2010, Lazio and Paladino were nearly tied in the most polls, with Paladino having a significant edge in Upstate New York and Lazio leading heavily in Downstate New York. Paladino was supported heavily by the Tea Party movement. On September 14, 2010, Paladino upset Lazio by a nearly two-to-one margin in the primary.

Polling

Results

Lieutenant Governor 
On the Republican side, Lazio endorsed Chautauqua County executive Greg Edwards as his choice for lieutenant governor on May 17, 2010. Tom Ognibene, former minority leader of the New York City Council, was Paladino's running mate. Other Republicans mentioned as potential candidates included Orange County executive Edward A. Diana, Monroe County executive Maggie Brooks, former New York Secretary of State Christopher Jacobs (Steve Levy's preferred running mate, Onondaga County executive Joanie Mahoney, 2006 lieutenant governor candidate C. Scott Vanderhoef (who instead ran for State Senate), and Myers Mermel (who later opted to run for overnor instead. Edwards narrowly defeated Tom Ognibene, creating a split ticket in which Lazio's preferred running mate became Paladino's running mate in the general election.

Independents and third parties

Conservative Party 
Lazio received the endorsement of the Conservative Party's executive committee in March 2010, with 14 party chairs in favor, four backing Steve Levy, and one (Erie County's Ralph Lorigo) backing Carl Paladino. At the Conservative Party convention in May 2010, Ralph Lorigo united with Steve Levy supporters to act as a placeholder on the ballot and earned 42% of the weighted ballot; by being a registered party member, he only needed 25% to force a primary election (something that Levy and Paladino, as a Democrat and Republican respectively, could not do). After Lorigo entered the gubernatorial race, Long demanded Lorigo's resignation; Lorigo responded by offering to wager the party chairmanship on the results of the race: If Lorigo won the primary, Long would resign and allow Lorigo (party second-in-command) to succeed him as Conservative Party chairman, but if Lazio won, Lorigo would resign his position within the Party.

On September 14, 2010, Lazio defeated Lorigo in the Conservative primary. Following Lazio's loss to Paladino in the GOP gubernatorial primary, Chairman Long indicated that he planned to move forward with Lazio; however, on September 27, 2010, Lazio confirmed that he would drop his bid for Governor by accepting a nomination for a judicial position in the Bronx. The Conservative Party then nominated Paladino as its candidate for Governor.

Results 

Nominee
Carl Paladino

Candidates
Rick Lazio, Republican nominee, won the primary but withdrew.
Ralph Lorigo, chairman of the Erie County Conservative Party.

Independence Party
The Independence Party of New York publicly endorsed presumptive Democratic nominee Andrew Cuomo prior to the party convention.

Nominee
Andrew Cuomo

Working Families Party
The Working Families Party was said to heavily favor Cuomo, but was reportedly concerned that the  party's damaged reputation may cause Cuomo to decline any nomination from them. In somewhat of a surprise move, the party nominated its own members for all but one statewide elected office, and did not cross-endorse Democrats as usual. The party nominated United Auto Workers lawyer Kenneth Schaffer as its nominee for governor in June 2010. After the federal investigation against the party was closed with no charges, speculation has run rampant that the party will vacate the line in favor of Cuomo by nominating Schaeffer for a judicial position and offering Cuomo a Wilson Pakula, which the party did unanimously in September 2010.

Nominee
Andrew Cuomo

Libertarian Party
The  Libertarian Party of New York chose Warren Redlich as its nominee at the state party convention on April 24, 2010.

Nominee
Warren Redlich, Guilderland Town Board member and criminal defense attorney.

Lost nomination
Kristin Davis, madam of the prostitution ring of which Eliot Spitzer was a client Davis refused to show up at the convention and as a result did not appear on the ballot.
Sam Sloan, author and board game expert.

Green Party
The Green Party of New York nominated national party co-founder Howie Hawkins, who had been a perennial candidate in state and federal elections since 2006, as its candidate at the party convention on May 15, 2010.

Nominee
Howie Hawkins

Rent Is Too Damn High Party

The Rent Is Too Damn High Party, whose perennial New York City mayoral candidate is Jimmy McMillan, fielded him in the New York gubernatorial election in 2010.

Campaign signatures
The Paladino campaign submitted 30,000 signatures for its Taxpayers Party. Charles Barron submitted 43,500 signatures for the Freedom Party, though a fellow New York City councilman, Lewis Fidler, has already announced his intention to challenge Barron's signatures. The Davis campaign submitted 22,000 signatures, the Hawkins campaign filed 27,000, and the Libertarian Party claimed to have submitted over 34,000.

General Election

Predictions

Polling

with Collins

with Lazio

with Lazio and Paladino

with Levy

Collins v. Patterson

Giuliani vs. Paterson

Lazio vs. Paterson

Results

The results of New York's gubernatorial elections are used to decide which parties receive automatic ballot access and what order the parties are listed on the ballot. Parties whose candidates for governor receive over 50,000 votes on that party's line receive automatic ballot access for the next four years until the next gubernatorial election. This rule applies regardless of whether the party fielded its own candidate or cross-endorsed the candidate of another party. Green Party candidate Howie Hawkins received over 57,000 votes, allowing the New York Green Party to be listed on the ballot for the following four years.

See also
Paterson, David "Black, Blind, & In Charge: A Story of Visionary Leadership and Overcoming Adversity." New York, New York, 2020

Notes

References

External links
New York State Board of Elections
Official candidate list

Campaign contributions for 2010 New York Governor from Follow the Money
New York Governor 2010 from OurCampaigns.com
2010 New York Governor Election graph of multiple polls from Pollster.com
Election 2010: New York Governor from Rasmussen Reports
New York Governor - Lazio vs. Cuomo from Real Clear Politics
2010 New York Governor's Race from CQ Politics
Race Profile in The New York Times
Official campaign websites (Archived)
Andrew Cuomo for Governor
Rick Lazio for Governor
Steve Levy for Governor
Carl Paladino for Governor
Warren Redlich for Governor
Online Guide to New York Politics, politics1.com
 Gormley, Michael (4/1/10). Who would want to be Governor? Associated Press. (A primer on the proposals of most of the candidates)

Gubernatorial
2010
New York
Andrew Cuomo
Howie Hawkins